In general relativity, the Weyl metrics (named after the German-American mathematician Hermann Weyl) are a class of static and axisymmetric solutions to Einstein's field equation. Three members in the renowned Kerr–Newman family solutions, namely the Schwarzschild, nonextremal Reissner–Nordström and extremal Reissner–Nordström metrics, can be identified as Weyl-type metrics.

Standard Weyl metrics

The Weyl class of solutions has the generic form

The coordinate system  serves best for symmetries of Weyl's spacetime (with two Killing vector fields being  and ) and often acts like cylindrical coordinates, but is incomplete when describing a black hole as  only cover the horizon and its exteriors.

Hence, to determine a static axisymmetric solution corresponding to a specific stress–energy tensor , we just need to substitute the Weyl metric Eq(1) into Einstein's equation (with c=G=1):

Reduced field equations for electrovac Weyl solutions

One of the best investigated and most useful Weyl solutions is the electrovac case, where  comes from the existence of (Weyl-type) electromagnetic field (without matter and current flows). As we know, given the electromagnetic four-potential , the anti-symmetric electromagnetic field  and the trace-free stress–energy tensor   will be respectively determined by

which respects the source-free covariant Maxwell equations:

Eq(5.a) can be simplified to:

Also, since  for electrovacuum, Eq(2) reduces to

 
 
 
 

where  yields Eq(7.a),  or  yields Eq(7.b),  or  yields Eq(7.c),  yields Eq(7.d), and Eq(5.b) yields Eq(7.e). Moreover, if we suppose  in the sense of matter-geometry interplay and assume asymptotic flatness, we will find that Eqs(7.a-e) implies a characteristic relation that

Practically, Eq(8.a) arising from  just works as a consistency relation or integrability condition.

Unlike the nonlinear Poisson's equation Eq(7.b), Eq(8.b) is the linear Laplace equation; that is to say, superposition of given vacuum solutions to Eq(8.b) is still a solution. This fact has a widely application, such as to analytically distort a Schwarzschild black hole.

We employed the axisymmetric Laplace and gradient operators to write Eqs(7.a-7.e) and Eqs(8.a-8.d) in a compact way, which is very useful in the derivation of the characteristic relation Eq(7.f). In the literature, Eqs(7.a-7.e) and Eqs(8.a-8.d) are often written in the following forms as well:

 

and

Considering the interplay between spacetime geometry and energy-matter distributions, it is natural to assume that in Eqs(7.a-7.e) the metric function  relates with the electrostatic scalar potential  via a function  (which means geometry depends on energy), and it follows that

Eq(B.1) immediately turns Eq(7.b) and Eq(7.e) respectively into

which give rise to

Direct quadrature of Eq(B.5) yields , with  being integral constants.

This relation is important in linearize the Eqs(7.a-7.f) and superpose electrovac Weyl solutions.

Newtonian analogue of metric potential Ψ(ρ,z)

In Weyl's metric Eq(1), ; thus in the approximation for weak field limit , one has

and therefore

This is pretty analogous to the well-known approximate metric for static and weak gravitational fields generated by low-mass celestial bodies like the Sun and Earth,

where  is the usual Newtonian potential satisfying Poisson's equation , just like Eq(3.a) or Eq(4.a) for the Weyl metric potential . The Newtonian analogue of  proves quite helpful in specifying particular Weyl-type solutions and extending existing Weyl-type solutions.

Schwarzschild solution

The Weyl potentials generating Schwarzschild's metric as solutions to the vacuum equations Eq(8) are given by

where

From the perspective of Newtonian analogue,  equals the gravitational potential produced by a rod of mass  and length  placed symmetrically on the -axis; that is, by a line mass of uniform density  embedded the interval . (Note: Based on this analogue, important extensions of the Schwarzschild metric have been developed, as discussed in ref.)

and after substituting the following mutually consistent relations

one can obtain the common form of Schwarzschild metric in the usual  coordinates,

The metric Eq(14) cannot be directly transformed into Eq(16) by performing the standard cylindrical-spherical transformation , because  is complete while  is incomplete. This is why we call  in Eq(1) as Weyl's canonical coordinates rather than cylindrical coordinates, although they have a lot in common; for example, the Laplacian  in Eq(7) is exactly the two-dimensional geometric Laplacian in cylindrical coordinates.

Nonextremal Reissner–Nordström solution

The Weyl potentials generating the nonextremal Reissner–Nordström solution as solutions to Eqs(7} are given by

where

and employing the following transformations

one can obtain the common form of non-extremal Reissner–Nordström metric in the usual  coordinates,

Extremal Reissner–Nordström solution

The potentials generating the extremal Reissner–Nordström solution as solutions to Eqs(7) are given by (Note: We treat the extremal solution separately because it is much more than the degenerate state of the nonextremal counterpart.)

Thus, the extremal Reissner–Nordström metric reads

and by substituting

we obtain the extremal Reissner–Nordström metric in the usual  coordinates,

Mathematically, the extremal Reissner–Nordström can be obtained by taking the limit  of the corresponding nonextremal equation, and in the meantime we need to use the L'Hospital rule sometimes.

Remarks: Weyl's metrics Eq(1) with the vanishing potential  (like the extremal Reissner–Nordström metric) constitute a special subclass which have only one metric potential  to be identified. Extending this subclass by canceling the restriction of axisymmetry, one obtains another useful class of solutions (still using Weyl's coordinates), namely the conformastatic metrics,

Weyl vacuum solutions in spherical coordinates 

Weyl's metric can also be expressed in spherical coordinates that

which equals Eq(1) via the coordinate transformation  (Note: As shown by Eqs(15)(21)(24), this transformation is not always applicable.) In the vacuum case, Eq(8.b) for  becomes

The asymptotically flat solutions to Eq(28) is

The other metric potential is given by

See also

 Schwarzschild metric
 Reissner–Nordström metric
 Distorted Schwarzschild metric

References

Black holes
General relativity
Exact solutions in general relativity